The Navajo class is a class of Towing, Salvage and Rescue Ships of the United States Navy. They were ordered in 2017 as the planned replacement for the aging s and s. The lead ship of the first batch of six ships was laid down in 2019. Two additional ships were ordered in 2020. In October 2021, Austal had been awarded a $145 million contact to build of two Towing, Salvage, and Rescue ships (T-ATS 11 and 12), and options for up to three additional T-ATS ships. On 23 July 2022, two additional Navajo-class ships were ordered from Austal.

Development 
Eight ships of the class were planned to replace the aging s and s. They were ordered in 2017 and on 16 March 2018 Gulf Island Fabrication was chosen to construct them. On 26 March 2020, an additional two ships were ordered by the navy. On 19 April 2021, Gulf Island announced that they had sold the contract along with the shipyard to Bollinger Shipyards.

Ships in class

References

External links
 Navsource

 
Rescue and salvage ships of the United States Navy
Auxiliary ship classes of the United States Navy